Bernardo Rosengurtt Gurvich (1916–1985) was a Uruguayan botanist, professor and agrostologist.

References

1916 births
1985 deaths
Uruguayan people of German descent
Uruguayan botanists
Agrostologists
20th-century botanists